The Second Yuying Foreign Languages School of Nanjing is a state-owned, privately run school established in 1993 in Nanjing, China. The school covers an area of 18 acres and has two campuses, offering 72 classes, with more than 2,700 students and 400 staff.

Development
When the school started in 1993, it had 2 classes and 19 staff.

English feature
Every year, the school sends a teacher to a foreign nation for training, and invites foreign teachers to the school.

References

http://www.njyysf.net/article/xxgk-001lv.aspx?id=16846
http://www.njyysf.net/article/xxgk-001lv.aspx?id=16850

External links
http://www.njyysf.net/
http://www.njyysf.net/article/200809/20080924191253491.swf

Educational institutions established in 1993
1993 establishments in China
Language schools in China